Solntse-Dubrava is a rural locality (a selo) and the administrative center of Gorozhanskoye Rural Settlement, Ramonsky District, Voronezh Oblast, Russia. The population was 64 as of 2010. There are 4 streets.

Geography 
Solntse-Dubrava is located 14 km northwest of Ramon (the district's administrative centre) by road. Komsomolsky is the nearest rural locality.

References 

Rural localities in Ramonsky District